Surtajin (also Romanized as Sūrtajīn and Soortjin; also known as Sūrtajen and Sūrteh Jīn) is a village in Kharqan Rural District, in the Central District of Razan County, Hamadan Province, Iran. At the 2006 census, its population was 364, in 95 families.

References 

Populated places in Razan County